Christopher "Burto" Burton (born 22 November 1981) is an Australian equestrian. He was selected to represent Australia at the 2012 Summer Olympics in equestrian eventing.

Personal
Nicknamed Burto, Burton was born on 22 November 1981 in Toowoomba, Queensland. He spent his childhood on a grain and cattle farm at Box Ridge, Brymaroo. He attended Kulpi State School in Queensland before going to high school at Downlands College. He moved to England to improve his chances of making the 2012 Summer Olympics. , he lives in Dorset, England.

Equestrian
Burton is an equestrian eventing competitor. He is coached by Brett Parbery. He has also been coached by Prue Barratt since 2010. His primary training base is Dorset, United Kingdom with a secondary base in Wilberforce, Australia. He was a member of Brymaroo Pony Club. His first Australian national team appearance was in 2010 at the Equestrian Games in Kentucky.

Burton finished 2nd at the 2011 FEI World Cup overall. He finished 8th at the 2011 Les Etoiles de Pau CCI4 held in Pau, France. He finished 5th at the 2011 Gatcombe British Open Championships held in Gatcombe, Great Britain. He finished 2nd and 3rd at the 2011 Le Pin au Haras Pin CIC3 held in Le Pin, France. He finished 2nd at the 2011 Sydney CIC3 held in Sydney, Australia. He finished 2nd at the 2011 Kihikihi CIC held in Kihikihi, New Zealand. He finished 2nd at the 2012 Saumur CCI3 held in Saumur, France.

Burton was selected to represent Australia at the 2012 Summer Olympics in equestrian eventing. The 2012 Games were his debut Games, after having attempted and failing to make the Games two times before. Riding Holstein Park Leilani, he placed 6th in team eventing and 16th individually.

Burton started the 2013 season with 10th-place finish at Badminton Horse Trials. Later that year he won the CICO3* in Aachen and won the Australian International Three Day Event riding TS Jamaimo. Following year he got selected to represent Australia at the 2014 World Equestrian Games in Normandy, France, but had to withdraw during the competition. In 2015 he placed 4th at the Luhmühlen Horse Trials and 3rd at the Burghley Horse Trials.

He got selected to represent Australia at the 2016 Summer Olympics where he won a team bronze and placed 5th individually. Burton was on the top of the individual leader board after the cross-country stage, but several mistakes in the jumping stage costed him the individual medal.

Few weeks after the Olympics Burton won the Burghley Horse Trials with the horse Nobilis. He became the first Australian winner at Burghley 4* since 2006.

CCI5* results

International Championship results

Notable Horses 

 Newsprint – 1995 Bay Thoroughbred Gelding (Rubiton)
 2008 Adelaide CCI**** Winner
 Holstein Park Leilani – 1996 Chestnut Mare (Lander)
 2010 World Equestrian Games – Individual 48th Place
 2012 London Olympics – Team Sixth Place, Individual 16th Place
 TS Jamaimo – 1999 Bay Thoroughbred Gelding (Urgent Request x Bustino)
 2013 Adelaide CCI**** Winner
 2014 World Equestrian Games – Team Fourth Place
 Nobilis 18 – 2005 Bay Hanoverian Gelding (Nobre XX x Lemon XX)
 2016 Burghley CCI**** Winner
 Fire Fly – 2010 Bay Dutch Warmblood Stallion (Zavall VDL x Corland)
 2016 FEI Eventing Young Horse World Championships – Gold Medal
 Santano II – 2007 Black Hanoverian Gelding (Sandro Hit x Brentano II)
 2016 Rio Olympics – Team Bronze Medal, Individual Fifth Place
 Lawtown Boy – 2010 Dark Brown Holsteiner Stallion (Larimar x Anthonysdream)
 2017 FEI Eventing Young Horse Championships – 11th Place

References

External links
 
 
 
 

Living people
Australian male equestrians
Olympic equestrians of Australia
Equestrians at the 2012 Summer Olympics
Equestrians at the 2016 Summer Olympics
1981 births
Olympic bronze medalists for Australia
Olympic medalists in equestrian
Medalists at the 2016 Summer Olympics